Tayeb Saddiki (5 January 1939 – 5 February 2016) was a Moroccan theatre director and one of the most iconic and prominent Arab artists, and is considered among the foremost Arab dramatists of the twentieth century. Trained in classical Western theater, Saddiki also embraced traditional Moroccan theatrical styles, fusing the two into a path-breaking combination of Western and traditional Moroccan theater. Known for staging spectacles played to large crowds in big arenas, Saddiki developed a style of festive theater that became a popular in the Arab world.

He is a pioneer of Arab theater and an actor and a film director, but also an award-winning author writing in both Arabic and French. From a family of scholars, he was born in Essaouira and grew up in Casablanca. After training courses with André Voisin, at the age of 17 he went abroad to France to study theater at Comédie de l'Ouest - CDO, directed by Hubert Gignoux. Back in Morocco, together with the Union Marocaine du Travail (UMT) he founded a Workers' theater / Al Masrah Al Oummali (1957). After that, he returned to France to further study theater tecnics at the TNP -the National Popular Theater in Paris-, under the direction of Jean Vilar.

At 23, he became artistic director of the Mohamed V theater (théâtre national Mohammed-V). After that he worked as director of the municipal theater of Casablanca (théâtre municipal de Casablanca) from 1964 to 1977.

He founded several theatre companies, Firqat Saddiki / Saddiki's troupe, Al Masrah Al Jawal / Traveling theater, Masrah Ennas / People's Theater and also his own cultural center at Casablanca, Espace Tayeb Saddiki (Tayeb Saddiki's center) at the boulevard Gandhi in Casablanca.
(Source : Tayeb Saddiki Foundation)

Biography
 1953 - Stage of Dramatic Art at Maâmora (Morocco), Interpretation Award / Direction André Voisin and Charles Nugue
 1954 - First contract with Moroccan theater troupe / la troupe du théâtre marocain, the first professional troupe in Morocco
 1956 - Workshop at Centre Dramatique de l’Ouest – C.D.O, Rennes - Direction Hubert Gignoux
 1957 - Works at the National Popular Theater (Théâtre National Populaire) - T.N.P in Paris, Direction Jean Vilar
 1957-1958 - Founder of the Workers' theater (Al Masrah Al Oummali), Morocco
 1959 - Training course at the Center Dramatique de l'Est - D.E, Direction Hubert Gignoux
 1960 - Study Tour Berliner Ensemble - Germany, Direction Hélène Weigel - Bertolt Brecht's theatre company
 1960 - Founder of The troupe of the Municipal Theater / (La troupe du Théâtre Municipal), Casablanca, Morocco
 1963 - Founder of Firqat Saddiki / Saddiki's troupe, Morocco
 1964 - Artistic director of the Mohamed V theater (théâtre national Mohammed-V), Rabat
 1967-1969 - Member of the executive committee of Institut International du Théâtre, I.T.I – UNESCO
 1964-1977 - Director of the municipal theater of Casablanca (théâtre municipal de Casablanca), Casablanca, Morocco
 1970-1977 - Founder of Café-théâtre, Théâtre Municipal de Casablanca, Casablanca, Morocco
 1970 - Founder of Masrah Ennas / People's Theater, Casablanca, Morocco
 1974 - Founder of Al Masrah Al Jawal / Traveling theater, Casablanca, Morocco
 1980 - Founder of Essaouira Festival Music first / la musique d'abord
 1980 - 1982 - Responsible at the Ministry of Tourism, Casablanca, Morocco
 1984-1986 - Television is moving (Attalfaza Tataharrak), S.N.R.T, program to revamp Moroccan television programs, Morocco
 1997 - Founder of the Espace Tayeb Saddiki (Mogador Theater), Casablanca, Morocco

Distinctions

Works

 Theater director: more than eighty works
 Repertory: has written thirty two plays (in Arabic and French), translation and adaptation of thirty-four dramatic works, eighteen co-written works
 Actor: in about fifty plays, a dozen movies and thirty five dramatic works and television shows
 Painter Calligrapher: Exhibitions in Morocco and Tunisia, Kuwait, Qatar, Sultanate of Oman, France, Canada, Belgium, Algeria ...
 Cinema: directed four short films and a movie (Zeft - 1984), wrote and directed a dozen documentaries and played in a dozen films
 Television: produced and directed for television thirty shows
 Television is moving (Attalfaza Tataharrak)": program to redesign programs of the Moroccan television SNRT (1984-1986)
 Other:
 Participated to the researches and writing of the book: Morocco and Traditional Islamic Crafts in Architecture (Le Maroc et l'Artisanat Traditionnel Islamique dans l'Architecture / Le Paccard) - 2 volumes, Author : André Paccard, Edition: Workshop 74, 1986
 Prefacier of the book: Mogador, my love (Mogador, mon amour), Author: Marcel Crespil, Illustrator: William Olegini, Edition: Casablanca: EDDIF, 1990
 Illustrator of the book: Freshness of Islam (Fraîcheur de l'Islam), Author: Gabriel Bounoure (1886-1969), Edition: Saint-Clément-la-Rivière: , 1995 ''
 Contributed to the writing of the book Moroccan Civilization, Arts and Cultures (Civilisation Marocaine, Arts et Cultures), under the direction of Mohamed Sijelmassi, editions OUM and Actes Sud / Sindbad, 1996

Cinema actor 

 1955 : Le Poulet (The Chicken), Jean Fléchet
 1956 : Le médecin malgré lui (Toubib Al Affia), Directed by Henry Jacques, adapted from Molière, presented at Cannes festival in 1956 (official selection)
 1957 : Brahim ou le collier de beignets (Brahim or the necklace of donuts), by Jean Fléchet, Presented at the Berlin Festival (1957)
 1959: Loqmat Aïch (for a bite of bread), by Larbi Bennani
 1960: Les fourberies Scapin, (Scapin the Schemer), Cinema adaptation of Molière's play (in Arabic), directed by Jean Mousselle and adapted by Mahieddine Bachtarzi Algeria, production Fred Orain : Castella Films & Armor Films
 1962: Tartarin De Tarascon, Francis Blanche
 1962: The children of the sun (Les enfants du soleil), Jacques Severac Cannes Film Festival of 1962 (official selection)
 1962: Lawrence of Arabia, David Lean
 1976: Arrissala (The Message), Mostapha Akkad
 1977: Zenobia Queen of Palmyrene, Serie TV with Nidal Al Achkar
 1984: Zeft (Ashphalte), by Tayeb Saddiki
 1986: The child of the sand (L’enfant du sable), Hamid Bénani
 1995: The Prayer of the Absentee (La prière de l’absent), Hamid Bénani
 2001: Assir Al Matrouz (the man who embroidered secrets), Omar Chraïbi
 2008: Voyage court mais trash (Short but trashy trip), Short film by Raja Saddiki

Scenarios and productions

Motion picture 
 Zeft, movies from the play by the same author Sidi Yassin Fi Tariq

Movie Scenarios 

 Blood Wedding, Souheil Ben Barka, 1976, as co-writer and dialogue
 Sijnabad, written by Tayeb Saddiki in 1984, never shot
 The golden tooth / la dent d'or, written by Tayeb Saddiki in 1985, never shot

Documentaries 
 Traditional medicine with Jacques Barratier (40 min)
 Dragonfly (Libellule) (30 min)
 The Ciriers of Fez (22 min)
 Moroccan painting (36 min)
 Agadir's marquee (40 min)
 Dakira (memory), 10 hours on the history of Morocco
 It was a faith (Il était une foi) (30 min), film about the Hassan II Mosque with Hamid Berrada

Institutional films 
 BCM (30 min)
 OCP (40 min)
 The Marrakech Festival (26 min)
 I.U.M (University of Ifrane) (25 min)
 The Baghdad Festival (20 min)

Adapted works for television 

 Al Faylassouf
 Mahjouba
 The Farce of the Master Pathelin
 Volpone
 Diwan Sidi Abderrahman El Mejdoub
 Sidi Yassin Fi Tariq
 El Harraz (2 versions)
 Annour Oua Addijour
 Khourafat Al Maskine
 Annakcha
 Translated Signs
 The superstition
 The good ones
 The Fear of the Blows
 Al Qouq fi Sandouq
 Moummou Boukhersa
 Nahnou
 Massiratouna
 Alf Hikaya Wa Hikaya Fi Souq Okad
 Maqamat Badii Ezzamane El Hamadani
 Aswat Oua Adouae
 The Seven Grains Of Beauty
 Al Fil Wa Sarawil
 Wa Laou Kanat Foula
 Jnane Chiba
 Qaftane Al Hob Al Mrassae Bal Houa
 Al Qouq Fi Sandouq
 Bouktef
 Azizi
 Al Karassi

Plays 

 Ammi Zalt
 Original work: Bonhomme Misère
 Staging and dramatic rewriting : André Voisin
 Adaptation: Ahmed Taïeb El Alj
 Language : Arabic
 Maâlem Azzouz
 Original work: Le Barbier de Séville, Pierre-Augustin Caron de Beaumarchais
 Adaptation: Ataa Ouakil (Abdessamad Kenfaoui, Tahar Ouaâziz and Ahmed Taïeb El Alj)
 Stage direction: André Voisin
 Language : Arabic

1955-1956 

 Ach’taba (les balayeurs)
 Original work: Troupe du Théâtre Marocain
 Stage direction: André Voisin
 Language : Arabic
 Aâmayel J’ha
 Original work: Les fourberies de Scapin, Molière
 Adaptation: Ataa Ouakil (Abdessamad Kenfaoui, Tahar Ouaâziz and Ahmed Taïeb El Alj)
 Stage direction: André Voisin
 Assistant: Tayeb Saddiki
 Language : Arabic
 Hamland
 Original work: William Shakespeare
 Translation: Khalil Matran, Tahar Ouaâziz
 Stage direction: André Voisin
 Language : Arabic
 Ahl Al Kahf (les gens de la caverne)
 Original work: Tawfiq Al Hakim
 Stage direction: Didier Béraud
 Language : Arabic

1956-1957 

Al Warith
 Original work: Le légataire universel, Jean-François Regnard
 Adaptation: Ahmed Taïeb El Alj and Tayeb Saddiki
 Stage direction: Tayeb Saddiki
 Language : Arabic
Al Faylassouf (le philosophe)
 Original work: La jalousie du barbouillé de Molière
 Adaptation & Stage direction: Ahmed Taïeb El Alj and Tayeb Saddiki
 Language : Arabic
Le médecin volant, Molière
 Adaptation & Stage direction: Ahmed Taïeb El Alj and Tayeb Saddiki
 Language : Arabic
Les Bonnes, Jean Genand
 Adaptation & Stage direction: Ahmed Taïeb El Alj and Tayeb Saddiki
 Language : Arabic

1957-1958 

Al Moufattich
 Original work: Le Révizor de Nicolaï Gogol
 Adaptation & Stage direction: Tayeb Saddiki
 Language : Arabic
Volte-face
 Original work: Bayn Yawm Wa layla (entre jour and nuit) de Tawfiq Al Hakim
 Translation : Théâtre multicolore, recueil de pièces de théâtre, Nouvelles Ed. Latines, 1954
 Stage direction: Tayeb Saddiki
 Language : French

1958-1959 

Al Jins Allatif
 Original work: L’assemblée des femmes and Lysistrata d’Aristophane
 Adaptation & Stage direction: Tayeb Saddiki
 Language : Arabic
Pantagleize
 Original work: Michel de Ghelderode
 Stage direction: Georges Goubert
 Language : French
Centre dramatique de l’Ouest – C.D.O. (role : Ban Boulah)

1959-1960 

Le Carthaginois
 Original work: Plaute
 Adaptation : Henri Clouard
 Stage direction: Daniel Sorano
 Language : French
Théâtre du Vieux-Colombier, Paris (role: Milphin)
Les fourberies de Scapin
 Original work: Molière
 Stage direction: Jacques Sarthou
 Language : French
Théâtre du Vieux-Colombier, Paris (role: Scapin)
La peur des coups, Georges Courteline
 Adaptation & Stage direction: Tayeb Saddiki
 Language : Arabic
Volpone, Ben Jonson
 Adaptation & Stage direction: Tayeb Saddiki
 Language : Arabic

1960-1961 

Qissat Al Hasnae (histoire de la belle)
 Original work: Lady Godiva, Jean Carrole
 Adaptation & Stage direction: Tayeb Saddiki
 Language : Arabic
Safar Tchûn Li
 Original work: Le Voyage de Tchong-li, Sacha Guitry
 Adaptation & Stage direction: Tayeb Saddiki
 Language : Arabic
Moulat Al Foundouk
 Original work: La locandiera de Carlo Goldoni
 Adaptation : Tayeb Saddiki
 Stage direction: Abdessamad Dinia
 Language : Arabic
Mahjouba
 Original work: L’école des femmes, Molière
 Adaptation & Stage direction: Tayeb Saddiki
 Language : Arabic

1961-1962 

 Fi Intidar Mabrouk
 Original work: En attendant Godot de Samuel Beckandt
 Adaptation & Stage direction: Tayeb Saddiki
 Language : Arabic
 Al Fassl Al Akhir
 Original work: Aziz Seghrouchni
 Stage direction: Tayeb Saddiki
 Language : Arabic

1962-1963 

 Al Moussadafa
 Original work: Le jeu de l’amour and du hasard, Pierre de Marivaux
 Adaptation & Stage direction: Tayeb Saddiki
 Language : Arabic

1963-1964 

 Hamid ou Hammad
 Original work: Abdallah Chakroun
 Adaptation : Tayeb Saddiki
 Stage direction: Abdessamad Dinia
 Language : Arabic
 Oued El Makhazine (The Battle of the Three Kings)
 Original work & Stage direction: Tayeb Saddiki
 Epic show

1964-1965 

 Moummou Boukhersa
 Original work: Amédée ou comment s’en débarrasser, Eugène Ionesco
 Adaptation & Stage direction: Tayeb Saddiki
 Language : Arabic

1965-1966 

 Soltan Tolba
 Original work: Abdessamad Kenfaoui
 Stage direction: Tayeb Saddiki
 Language : Arabic
 Sidi Yassin Fi Tariq
 Original work & Stage direction: Tayeb Saddiki
 Language : Arabic
 Al Maghrib Wahed (le Maroc est Un)
 Original work: Saïd Saddiki and Tayeb Saddiki
 Stage direction: Tayeb Saddiki
 Epic show

1966-1967 

 Madinat Annouhas
 Original work: Saïd Saddiki
 Stage direction: Tayeb Saddiki
 Language : Arabic
 Rajoul Fi Al Massida
 Original work: , Robert Thomas
 Adaptation & Stage direction: Tayeb Saddiki
 Language : Arabic

1967-1968 

 Diwan Sidi Abderrahman El Mejdoub
 Original work & Stage direction: Tayeb Saddiki
 Language : Arabic

1968-1969 

 Moulay Ismaïl
 Original work: Saïd Saddiki and Tayeb Saddiki
 Stage direction: Tayeb Saddiki
 Epic show

1969-1970 

 Annakcha
 Original work : Le journal d’un fou, Nicolaï Gogol
 Original work & Stage direction: Tayeb Saddiki
 Language : Arabic
 Al Akbach Tatamarrane
 Original work: Ahmed Taïeb El Alj and Tayeb Saddiki
 Stage direction : Tayeb Saddiki
 Language : Arabic
 Arras Oua Achaâkouka
 Original work: Saïd Saddiki
 Stage direction : Tayeb Saddiki
 Language : Arabic

1970-1971 

 Kaddour Nour and Ghandour
 Original work: Fando and lys, Fernando Arrabal
 Adaptation : Tayeb Saddiki
 Stage direction : Hamid Zoughi
 Language : Arabic
 Language : Arabic
 Je mange de ce pain-là (I eat from that Bread)
 Original work and stage direction: Tayeb Saddiki
 Language : French
 ‘Ala Baladi Al Mahboub
 Original work: Ali Haddani and Tayeb Saddiki
 Stage direction : Tayeb Saddiki
 Language : Arabic
 Epic show
 Al Harraz
 Original work : Abdeslam Chraïbi
 Rewriting & Stage direction: Tayeb Saddiki
 Language : Arabic

1971-1972 

 Maârakat Zellaqa
 Original work and Stage direction: Tayeb Saddiki
 Epic show
 Maqamat Badii Ezzamane El Hamadani
 Original work and Stage direction : Tayeb Saddiki
 Language : Arabic

1972-1973 

 Annour Oua Addijour
 Original work : Abdeslam Chraïbi and Tayeb Saddiki
 Stage direction : Tayeb Saddiki
 Language : Arabic
 La magie rouge (Red Magic)
 Original work : Michel de Ghelderode
 Stage direction : Tayeb Saddiki
 Presented by two theatratic troupes : ATF (Friends of French theatre, France) and Masrah Ennas (Morocco)
 Language : French
 Kane Ya Ma Kane Aou Maghrib 73
 Original work : Saïd Saddiki
 Stage direction : Tayeb Saddiki
 Language : Arabic

1973-1974 

 Essefoud
 Original work and Stage direction : Tayeb Saddiki
 Language : Arabic
 Al Qouq fi Sandouq
 Original work : Misère and noblesse, Eduardo Scarpandta
 Stage direction : Tayeb Saddiki
 Language : Arabic
 Moulay Idriss
 Original work : Abdeslam Al Beqqali
 Stage direction : Tayeb Saddiki
 Epic show

1974-1975 

 Khourafat Al Maskine
 Original work and Stage direction : Tayeb Saddiki
 Language : Arabic
 Cha’ir Al Hamra
 Collective creation
 Stage direction : Tayeb Saddiki
 Epic show
 Al Massira Al Khadra
 Collective creation
 Stage direction : Tayeb Saddiki
 Epic show

1975-1976 

 Al Ghoufrane
 Original work : Azzeddine El Madani, from the book of Abou Alaa Al Maârri
 Stage direction : Tayeb Saddiki
 Language : Arabic

1976-1977 

 Bouktef
 Original work : Abdessamad Kenfaoui
 Stage direction : Tayeb Saddiki
 Language : Arabic

1979-1980 

 Darna 
 Original work : Tayeb Saddiki
 One Man Show / Tales
 Language : Arabic / French

1980-1981 

Iqad Assarira fi Tarikh Essaouira
 Original work : Mohamed Ben Saïd Saddiki
 Adaptation and Stage direction : Tayeb Saddiki
 Language : Arabic
 Al Bey’aa
 Original work and Stage direction : Tayeb Saddiki
 Epic show

1982-1983 

 Chants Mystiques, les confréries
 Original work and Stage direction: Tayeb Saddiki
 Poems and texts from Sufis and mystics
 Language : Arabic

1983-1984 

 Kitab Al Imtae Wa Al Mouanassa (Abū Hayyān al-Tawhīdī)
 Original work : Tayeb Saddiki
 Stage direction : Tayeb Saddiki
 Language : Arabic / French

1984-1985 

 Alf Hikaya Wa Hikaya fi Souq Okad
 Original work : Walid Saif
 Scenario : Tayeb Saddiki and Nidal Ashqar
 Stage direction : Tayeb Saddiki
 Language : Arabic

1985-1986 

 Massiratouna
 Collective creation
 Stage direction : Tayeb Saddiki
 Epic show
 Nahnou
 Collective creation
 Stage direction : Tayeb Saddiki
 Epic show

1989-1990 

 Aswat Oua Adouae
 Original work : Saïd Saddiki and Mohammed Kaouti
 Stage direction : Tayeb Saddiki
 Epic show

1990-1991 

 Les sept grains de beauté
 Original work and Stage direction : Tayeb Saddiki
 Language : French
 Les folies berbères
 Original work : Tayeb Saddiki
 Stage direction : Abdelkader Alloula
 Language : French / Arabic

1991-1992 

 Nous sommes faits pour nous entendre
 Original work and Stage direction : Tayeb Saddiki
 Language : French

1993-1994 

 Molière, ou pour l’amour de l’humanité (Prix Atlas)
 Original work and Stage direction : Tayeb Saddiki
 Language : French

1996-1997 

 Al Fil Oua Saraouil (éléphant and pantalons)
 Original work and Stage direction : Tayeb Saddiki
 Bsat theater en Arabic

1997-1998 

 Jnane Chiba
 Original work and Stage direction : Tayeb Saddiki
 Bsat theater in Arabic
 Wa Laou Kanat Foula
 Original work and Stage direction : Tayeb Saddiki
 Bsat theater in Arabic

1998-1999 

 Qaftane Al Hob Al Mrassae Bal Houa
 Original work and Stage direction : Tayeb Saddiki
 Bsat theater in Arabic

1999-2000 

 As’hour ‘Inda Al Mouslimine, Al Yahoud wa Annassara
 Original work and Stage direction : Tayeb Saddiki
 Bsat theater in Arabic

2000-2001 

 Tiw Tiw
 Original work and Stage direction : Tayeb Saddiki
 Language : Arabic
 Kids theater

2001-2002 

 Al Masrah Elmahdoume
 Original work : Tayeb Saddiki (translated from le dîner de gala)
 Adaptation and Stage direction : Tayeb Saddiki
 Language : Arabic

2003-2004 

 Azizi
 Original work and Stage direction : Tayeb Saddiki from original texts and poems of Saïd Saddiki
 Language : Arabic and French
 La Boule Magique (la Bola Magica)
 Original work and Stage direction : Tayeb Saddiki
 Language : Arabic and Spanish
 Kids theater

2005-2006 

 Al Karassi
 Original work : les chaises, Eugène Ionesco
 Adaptation and Stage direction : Tayeb Saddiki
 Language : Arabic

2010-2011 

 Bouhdi (Wana Mali) (Alone, Why do I care)
 Original work: Tayeb Saddiki
 One Man Show
 Language : Arabic / French

2018-2019 

 Sidi Abderrahmane El Majdoub
 Original work: Tayeb Saddiki (1966)
 Production : Tayeb Saddiki Foundation
 Language : Arabic
 Morocco - France - Italy - United Arab Emirates

References

Moroccan male writers
Moroccan dramatists and playwrights
1939 births
2016 deaths
People from Essaouira
Male dramatists and playwrights
20th-century dramatists and playwrights
20th-century male writers
Commandeurs of the Ordre des Arts et des Lettres